The 2021 season was the Minnesota Vikings' 61st in the National Football League (NFL), their sixth playing home games at U.S. Bank Stadium and their eighth and final under head coach Mike Zimmer. They were eliminated from playoff contention for the second straight season following a Week 17 loss to the Green Bay Packers. The day after the team's last game of the season, the Vikings fired Zimmer and general manager Rick Spielman.

Draft

The Vikings entered the 2021 NFL draft with no second-round pick, having traded it to the Jacksonville Jaguars in exchange for DE Yannick Ngakoue during the 2020 season; however, they picked up an extra third-round selection when they traded Ngakoue to the Baltimore Ravens a few weeks later. They also received an additional fifth-round selection from the Ravens as part of a multi-pick trade during the 2020 draft, as well as additional fourth-round selections from the Chicago Bears (as part of a multi-pick trade) and the Buffalo Bills (as part of the trade that sent Stefon Diggs to the Bills ahead of the 2020 season). The Vikings were also awarded two compensatory selections at the NFL's annual spring owners' meetings; they received one additional pick in the fourth round and one in the sixth round, compensating for the losses of Mackensie Alexander, Jayron Kearse, Andrew Sendejo, Trae Waynes and Stephen Weatherly. On March 19, 2021, the Vikings were forced to forfeit a seventh-round selection due to a salary cap violation relating to a practice squad player during the 2019 season.

On the first day of the draft, the Vikings traded their first-round pick and a fourth-round pick to the New York Jets in exchange for the first-round pick the Jets had received from the Seattle Seahawks (23rd overall) and two additional third-round picks. With their new first-round pick, the Vikings selected offensive tackle Christian Darrisaw, the first player at the position to be taken in the first round by the Vikings since Matt Kalil with the fourth overall pick in 2012. With no second-round pick, the Vikings' draft resumed in the third round with the picks they received from the Jets the previous day and the one they received from Baltimore in exchange for Yannick Ngakoue, in addition to their original third-round pick. With these, they picked quarterback Kellen Mond, linebacker Chazz Surratt, guard Wyatt Davis and defensive end Patrick Jones II. In the fourth round, the Vikings took running back Kene Nwangwu, cornerback Camryn Bynum and defensive end Janarius Robinson, followed by wide receiver Ihmir Smith-Marsette and tight end/punter Zach Davidson in the fifth. The Vikings' final pick of the draft came in the sixth round, when they selected defensive tackle Jaylen Twyman with the 199th overall pick.

Draft trades

Staff

Final roster

Preseason

Schedule
The Vikings' preliminary preseason schedule was announced on May 12. The exact dates and times were finalized on June 3.

Game summaries

Week 1: vs. Denver Broncos

Week 2: vs. Indianapolis Colts

Week 3: at Kansas City Chiefs

Regular season

Schedule
In addition to their usual six games home and away against their NFC North rivals, the Vikings would also play games against each of the teams from the NFC West and the AFC North, as well as the two teams that, like the Vikings, finished in third place in their divisions in the NFC East and NFC South in 2020: the Dallas Cowboys and the Carolina Panthers. Following an agreement between the league and the National Football League Players Association to expand the regular season schedule to 17 games, the Vikings also played against the Los Angeles Chargers, one of the third-placed teams from the American Football Conference (AFC) whom they were not originally scheduled to play in 2021. The Vikings' 2021 schedule was announced on May 12.

Note: Intra-division opponents are in bold text.

Game summaries

Week 1: at Cincinnati Bengals

This was head coach Mike Zimmer's first return to Cincinnati since 2013, his last season with the Bengals before departing to become the Vikings head coach. Zimmer served as defensive coordinator for the Bengals under then-head coach Marvin Lewis from 2008 to 2013.

Week 2: at Arizona Cardinals

Week 3: vs. Seattle Seahawks

Week 4: vs. Cleveland Browns

Week 5: vs. Detroit Lions

Week 6: at Carolina Panthers

Week 8: vs. Dallas Cowboys

Week 9: at Baltimore Ravens

Week 10: at Los Angeles Chargers

Week 11: vs. Green Bay Packers

Week 12: at San Francisco 49ers

Week 13: at Detroit Lions

Week 14: vs. Pittsburgh Steelers

Week 15: at Chicago Bears

Week 16: vs. Los Angeles Rams

Week 17: at Green Bay Packers

Week 18: vs. Chicago Bears

Standings

Division

Conference

Statistics

Team leaders

Source: Pro-Football-Reference.com

League rankings

Source: ProFootballReference.com

Pro Bowl
Three Vikings players were named to the 2022 Pro Bowl when the rosters were announced on December 20, 2021. On offense, Dalvin Cook led the voting among NFC running backs to reach his third straight Pro Bowl, while WR Justin Jefferson made it two in a row; on defense, Harrison Smith received the most fan votes among NFC safeties to go to his sixth Pro Bowl. Those three were joined by T Brian O'Neill on January 26, 2022, after Tampa Bay Buccaneers tackle Tristan Wirfs was ruled out due to injury. Quarterback Kirk Cousins was added to the NFC roster on January 31 following the withdrawal of Packers QB Aaron Rodgers due to injury.

References

External links

Minnesota
Minnesota Vikings seasons
Minnesota Vikings